is a mecha manga series created by Mamoru Nagano, building on his work on the anime series Heavy Metal L-Gaim. The story takes place cluster of four major planetary systems. Amaterasu, the immortal emperor of the Grees Kingdom on the planet Delta Belune, is destined to rule the whole Joker System. He and Lachesis, his bride (and a fatima, an artificial life-form), are the main characters of this epic story. An anime film adaptation of the first volume, directed by Kazuo Yamazaki, was released in 1989.

Overview
The Five Star Stories takes its name from the Joker Star Cluster where the stories take place. The star cluster is made up of four stars: Eastern, Western, Southern and Northern. The "fifth star" is a large comet named Stant that passes through that sector of space every 1,500 years pulling with it its own collection of orbiting planets.

In the distant past the Farus Di Kanon Empire, now commonly known as the "Super Empire", controlled all four solar systems of the Joker Cluster. They enjoyed a level of technology much higher than is currently known and sent explorers to the far reaches of the Joker Cluster. Around the year 9000 AD (Ammon Duul) the empire collapsed due to internal strife. The explorers were called home and what remained of civilization focused mainly on survival. Much technology and knowledge was lost by the time the imperial families of Amaterasu, Fillmore and Hathuha gathered and established the JC era. JC stands for "Joker Calendar" and was meant to give a common frame of reference to all nations to help foster a lasting peace. The JC calendar was adopted but the dream of peace was never realized.

The first story of The Five Star Stories begins in JC 2988. At this time interstellar travel is common and genetically engineered "fatimas" are well established as necessary co-pilots of the fearsome mortar heads that dominate the battlefields. Warfare between nations is commonplace and few still hope for peace.

Mortar heads are the combat mainstays of the Joker Universe. They are mecha which require superhuman reflexes and skill to control, and are therefore only utilized by headliners with Fatima copilots. Fatimas are humanoid creatures genetically engineered for a life of service on the battlefield. Fatimas are necessary copilots for mortar heads and mentally merge with the computer systems of these devastating machines to control weapons, communications and other vital processes. As such, Fatimas are designed to have computational skills rivaling any computer.

As of the 2013 May issue of Newtype, the setting of FSS has changed to fit the lore of Mamoru Nagano's 2012 film Gothicmade. MH (Mortar Headd) has been renamed GTM (GothicMade), while Fatimas have been renamed AF (Automatic Flowers).

Media

Manga
Sixteen volumes of manga have been published beginning in 1986 and up until the present. 

An English translation was published by Toyspress, a company cofounded by the author. To date, 26 volumes of the English version have been produced, covering Japanese volumes 1 through 10. Volumes 11 onwards have yet to be translated and the status of future English versions is currently unknown.

The major story arcs of the manga are:

Film adaptation
A film adaptation of The Five Star Stories covers the events in the first arc of the manga, Destiny Three Fates: Lachesis. It was created by Sunrise, directed by Kazuo Yamazaki, produced by Haruki Kadokawa, and premiered in Japan on March 11, 1989.  It was re-released in 2002 in DVD format. The licensing rights are currently owned by ADV Films, and an English version was released in March 2005.

Reception
According to Oricon, reboots of the first three volumes have all ranked within the top 30 best-selling manga of during their release week: Book I at number 11 selling 31,471 copies, book II at number 23 selling 30,958 copies, and book III at number 15 selling 38,437 copies. The manga had over 8.5 million copies in print as of January 2018.

References

External links
 

1986 manga
1989 anime films
ADV Films
Animated films based on manga
Japanese animated films
Kadokawa Shoten manga
Kadokawa Dwango franchises
Manga adapted into films
Science fiction anime and manga
Sunrise (company)
Extraterrestrials in anime and manga